Beloved Augustin is a 1960 West German historical comedy film directed by Rolf Thiele and starring Matthias Fuchs, Ina Duscha, and Veronika Bayer. It is not a remake of the 1940 film of the same title.

The film's sets were designed by the art directors Arno Richter and Felix Smetana. It was shot in agfacolor with location filming taking place in Austria and Bavaria. It was made by the revived UFA company.

Cast

References

External links

West German films
German historical comedy films
1960s historical comedy films
Films directed by Rolf Thiele
Films based on German novels
Films set in the 1800s
Depictions of Napoleon on film
UFA GmbH films
1960s German-language films
1960s German films